Milan Bokša (born 3 May 1951) is a Czech football manager.

Bokša coached numerous clubs in the Czech First League, including Union Cheb, Petra Drnovice, Sigma Olomouc, Baník Ostrava, SK České Budějovice, 1. FC Synot, FK Mladá Boleslav and Vysočina Jihlava.

References

External links
  Bokša skončil, Jihlava s ním nepočítá at iDNES.cz - 16 June 2007

1951 births
Living people
Czech footballers
Czech football managers
Czechoslovak footballers
Czechoslovak football managers
Czech First League managers
FK Teplice managers
SK Sigma Olomouc managers
FC Baník Ostrava managers
SK Dynamo České Budějovice managers
1. FC Slovácko managers
FK Mladá Boleslav managers
FC Vysočina Jihlava managers
FK Hvězda Cheb managers
Association footballers not categorized by position
FK Drnovice managers
People from Aš
Sportspeople from the Karlovy Vary Region